Diospyros montana, the Bombay ebony, is a small deciduous tree in the ebony family up to  tall, distributed all along the Western Ghats of India, Sri Lanka, Indo-China through to Australia.

References

External resources
 Britannica
 Diospyros montana
 
 

montana
Flora of tropical Asia
Trees of Australia
Plants described in 1795